Rousset may refer to:

 Rousset, Hautes-Alpes, in the Hautes-Alpes département
 Rousset, Bouches-du-Rhône, in the Bouches-du-Rhône département
 Rousset-les-Vignes, in the Drôme département
 Rousset (grape), another name for the French wine grape Calitor
 Rousset (surname)